B. robusta may refer to:

 Bhesa robusta, a plant species found in India, Indonesia, Malaysia, Myanmar, Singapore, Thailand, Vietnam and possibly Bhutan
 Bolitoglossa robusta, a salamander species found in Costa Rica and Panama
 Buergeria robusta, a frog species endemic to Taiwan

See also
 Robusta (disambiguation)